Sandra Cinto is a Brazilian contemporary artist, known for her sculpture, drawing, paintings, and installations. Born in Santo Andre, Brazil in 1968; Cinto is  currently living and working in São Paulo, Brazil. Cinto's artwork mixes installations, paintings, and detailed pen drawings. Sandra Cinto continues to produce artwork and showcase her work.

== Background and education ==
Cinto was born in 1968 in Santo André, Brazil. She graduated with a degree in art education, from Faculdades Integradas Teresa D’Ávila (FATEA), Santo André, Brazil, in 1990.

Work 
Cinto's media includes pen and acrylic on canvas, wood, and walls. As well as sculptures, made with various materials.  Her work has been shown in many exhibitions such as Sandra Cinto: Chance and Necessity, USF Contemporary Art Museum, Tampa, Florida, USA 2016,  Sandra Cinto,  House Triangle, São Paulo, Brazil 1997, and others.

Assorted exhibitions 
 2016-Sandra Cinto: Chance and Necessity, curated by Noel Smith, West Gallery, USF Contemporary Art Museum, Tampa, Florida, USA
 2014- Fundación Luis Seoane, A Corunha, Spain
 2013- Pausa., Casa Triângulo, São Paulo, Brazil, Piece of Silence, Tanya Bonakdar Gallery, New York, USA,
 2010- Imitação da Água, curated by Jacopo Crivelli Visconti, Instituto Tomie Ohtake, São Paulo, Brazil
 2006- Construção, Casa Triângulo, São Paulo, Brazil
 2005- Sandra Cinto, Centre de Création Bazouges la Perouse, France
 1998- Sandra Cinto, Casa Triângulo, São Paulo, Brazil

External links 
 Sandra Cinto's Encontro das Águas
 INTERSECTIONS

References 

1968 births
Living people
20th-century Brazilian women artists
21st-century Brazilian women artists
21st-century Brazilian artists
Brazilian installation artists
Brazilian painters